Wilhelm Island is an island in the Svalbard archipelago. It is situated northeast of Olav V Land on Spitsbergen, in Hinlopen Strait. Its area is 120 km².
About 33,5 % of the island is covered with ice. The island was named after Wilhelm I.

See also
 List of islands of Norway

References

Islands of Svalbard
Uninhabited islands of Norway